Vladimir Nikolayevich Semenkovich (1861 – 1932) was a Russian ethnologist and archaeologist, best known for his work in historical geography of Upper Don and Oka Gelonians and Mordvins where he had identified some of the Herodotus's tribes with contemporary ethnic groups of the Russian Empire and described the difference between physical, and geographical conditions of European Russia in the fifth century BC and the modern period.

Biography 
Valdimir Semenkovich was graduated from Kronstadt Higher Naval Technical School in 1883 and assigned to Chesma as Engineer Officer (Lieutnant of Imperial Russian Navy) where he served until 1891. He had resigned in 1891 and bought estate Vaskino in Serpukhovsky Uyezd, Moscow Governorate in 1894. Anton Chekhov bought estate Melikhovo almost the same time and they became neighbours for more than 10 years. Vladimir Semenkovich  devoted himself to ethnology, archeology, and ethnography but first he had become known as publicist after he wrote number of articles in newspaper Moskovskiye Vedomosti (Moscow News)", journals Russky Arkhiv (Russian Archive), Russkoye Bogatstvo (Russian Wealth), and his "North of Russia In Naval and Commercial Relations" in "Russkoye obozreniye (Russian review)" journal in 1894. Following the death of the poet Afanasii Foet in 1892, Semenkovich, whose grandmother was the sister of Foet's father, became the executor of the poet's literary estate. Semenkovich's contemporaries recalled his energy and volatile temper. Anton Chekhov would jokingly call him his “savage neighbor.”

Ethnology work 
Vladimir Semenkovich became Professor and correspondent of Moscow Archeological Institute (merged with Moscow State University in 1920s) on 15 May 1909. On 5 November 1909, he was enlisted as honorable member of the institute. In September 1910 he was enlisted as active member of the institute, and awarded with Golden medal. Semenkovich issued the book of notes by Pierre Martin La Martinière "Travel in the Nordic countries" dated 1637-ca.1676 in 1912 and became Toulouse International Academy Professor and correspondent in the same year. He became the head of the Historical Geography Department in 1914.

Gelonians and Mordvins 
In 1913, Vladimir Semenkovich's monograph "Gelonians and Mordvins" was issued.

Charity 
Semenkovich had been the director of Alexandria Orphan Trade School For Boys and was granted the rank of Active State Councillor on 1 January 1912 for his merit in Moscow Orphanage Council activity.

Family 
Vladimir Semenkovich married Yevgenia Telyatnikova in 1887. Yevgenia just graduated from Sankt-Peterburg Conservatory. She was the daughter of Sevastopol first guild merchant Mikhail Telyatnikov. The couple lived in Moscow, they attended concerts, operas, and paid visits to Foets where they took part in musical evenings. Leo Tolstoy and Eugene Botkin were among the numerous guests and enjoyed Yevgenia playing piano.
Vladimir and Yevgenia Semenkovich had 7 children: Varvara, Sergei, Vsevolod, Yekaterina, Vera, Natalia, and Alexander. They divorced in 1904. The youngest son, Alexander Semenkovich became an ethnographer. He finished Crimean Frunze Tavrichesky State University in 1922, his thesis was "Art of Crimean Tatars" (now in Sevastopol Ethnological Museum). He died of tuberculosis aged 25.

Bibliography 
North of Russia In Naval and Commercial Relations. Russian Review Journal. Moscow, 1894
Vladimir Semenkovich. Preface to Pierre Martin de la Martinière's "Travel in the Nordic countries". Moscow, 1911 (lost)
Pierre Martin de la Martinière, Stefan Kuznetsov, Vladimir Semenkovich. Travel in the Nordic countries, which describes the customs, lifestyle and superstition of Norwegians, Lapps, Kilopys, Borandayetses, Siberians, Samoyeds, Novozemeltsis, and Icelanders, with many pictures (1637-ca.1676). Moscow Archeological Institute, 1912
Gelonians and Mordvins. Materials and research on the historical geography of the upper reaches of the Don and the Oka. Part II, Moscow, 1911 (lost)
Gelonians and Mordvins. Materials and research on the historical geography of the upper reaches of the Don and the Oka. Part I. A.I. Snegiryova's Publishing, Moscow, 1913

See also 
, Ukraine. Site of Gelonus eighth-third c BC
Gelonians
Mordvins

References

Sources 

Natalia Gorbacheva [granddaughter]. Po stranitsam semeinykh arkhivov [Family Archives' Pages]. Moscow, 2001 (in Russian)

External links 
Vladimir Semenkovich's works in Boris Yeltsin Presidental Library
Russian Bloodline Foundation
Semenkovich family archive
Afanasii Foet's letter
Anton Chekhov's letter to Vladimir Semenkovich, 13 October 1896

Russian ethnologists
Archaeologists from Moscow
1861 births
1932 deaths
Plekhanov Russian University of Economics alumni
Academic staff of Moscow State University
Moscow State University alumni